Elin Ingrid Johanna Rubensson (born 11 May 1993) is a Swedish football midfielder currently playing in the Damallsvenskan for BK Häcken and the Swedish National Team. She was part of and played an important role for Sweden at the Under 19 Championship in 2012. Between 2008 and 2012, Rubensson scored nearly 50 goals for the Sweden U17 and U19 youth national teams.

Club career
In May 2013 Malmö converted Rubensson from a forward to a left back. She was inspired by then boyfriend Filip Stenström, a full back with Malmö's male team.

She left champions Malmö (who had become known as FC Rosengård) in December 2014, to sign a two-year contract with Kopparbergs/Göteborg FC.

On August 4, 2018 she signed a 5-year contract extension with Kopparbergs/Göteborg FC.

International career
Rubensson made her debut for the Swedish national team in October 2012. She was named to Sweden's squad for the 2015 FIFA Women's World Cup and appeared in 4 matches. Rubensson appeared in all 6 matches for Sweden at the 2016 Summer Olympics and won the Silver Medal.

In July 2017 Rubensson was named to the Sweden roster for the UEFA Women's Euro 2017, she appeared in two matches as Sweden lost to the Netherlands in the Quarterfinals.
She scored in the 5-1 win over Thailand at the 2019 Women's World Cup.

International goals

Matches and goals scored at World Cup & Olympic tournaments

Matches and goals scored at European Championship tournaments

Personal life
Rubensson has two siblings, Jacob and Cajsa. Cajsa is also a footballer and plays for the youth teams of Sweden and FC Rosengård. In 2018, Rubensson married fellow footballer Filip Stenström, who took her surname afterwards. The couple have a son, Frans, born in 2020. Rubensson is also a certified interior designer.

Honours

Club
 LdB FC Malmö / FC Rosengård
 Damallsvenskan: 2010, 2011, 2013, 2014
 Svenska Supercupen: 2011, 2012

Kopparbergs/Göteborg FC
 Damallsvenskan: 2020

International
Sweden
 UEFA Women's Under-19 Championship: 2012
 Summer Olympic Games: Silver Medal, 2016

References

Match reports

External links

Profile  at SvFF

1993 births
Living people
Swedish women's footballers
Sweden women's international footballers
People from Ystad
FC Rosengård players
Damallsvenskan players
BK Häcken FF players
2015 FIFA Women's World Cup players
Footballers at the 2016 Summer Olympics
People from Ystad Municipality
Olympic footballers of Sweden
Medalists at the 2016 Summer Olympics
Olympic silver medalists for Sweden
Olympic medalists in football
Women's association football forwards
2019 FIFA Women's World Cup players
Sportspeople from Skåne County
UEFA Women's Euro 2022 players
UEFA Women's Euro 2017 players